Peptoniphilus harei is a  Gram-positive and anaerobic  bacterium from the genus of Peptoniphilus which has been isolated from humans.

References 

Bacteria described in 1997
Eubacteriales